Gary Cole (born 5 February 1956) is an Australian football (soccer) player, who played for the Australia national football team 40 times and scored 20 goals between 1975 and 1984. He was most recently the Football director for A-League club Sydney FC, made redundant in December 2012.

Playing career
Transferred from Ringwood Wilhelmina to Fitzroy Alexander (later called Heidelberg United) in 1976 for a transfer fee of 6,000 after three years at Ringwood. Cole became one of the early stars of the National Soccer League as a striker, scoring 88 goals in six seasons at Heidelberg. In 1984, Cole moved to rival NSL club Preston Lions FC after injuring his ankle badly in 1983, and went on to score 21 goals for the club before retiring in 1986.

On 14 August 1981, he scored seven goals against Fiji, and set an Australian record for the most goals scored in an international match. His record was broken in 2001, when Archie Thompson scored 13 goals against American Samoa.

Coaching career
Cole has coached at various Victorian Premier League clubs and coached the Victorian state representative team after previously working on a full-time basis at the AIS in Canberra.

Cole was Melbourne Victory FC's first director of football, commencing this role from its inaugural season in 2005 until mid 2011.

Honours
 Australian national football team 1979-1982 19 caps and 17 goals.
 Victorian Representative Honours (Playing) 1974 - 1975
 Victorian Representative Honours (Coaching) 2003

References

External links 
 Aussie Footballers Coates to Condon 

1956 births
Living people
Footballers from Greater London
Australian people of English descent
Australian soccer players
Australia international soccer players
Australia B international soccer players
National Soccer League (Australia) players
Australian soccer coaches
Association football forwards
Melbourne Victory FC directors of football